The Battle of Lize (笠泽之战) was fought between the states of Wu and Yue in the Warring States period of Chinese history. In 478 BC, Yue attacked Wu and defeated Wu's army.

References 

478 BC
Lize 478 BC
5th century BC in China
Lize

zh:越灭吴之战#笠泽之战